Valery Ivanovich Chaptynov (11 June 1945 – 10 August 1997) was a Russian politician. He was the first Head of the Altai Republic, the first Member of the Federation Council from the Altai Republic, and Chairman of the Presidium of the Supreme Soviet and First Secretary of the Gorno-Altai Communist Party for the duration of the short-lived Gorno-Altai Autonomous Soviet Socialist Republic.

References

1945 births
1997 deaths
People from the Altai Republic
Members of the Federation Council of Russia (1994–1996)
Members of the Federation Council of Russia (1996–2000)
Heads of the Altai Republic